Yano is a Tani language of India, possibly a variety of Nishi.

References

Mark Post, 2012, "The Language, Culture, Environment and Origins of Proto-Tani Speakers", in Huber & Blackburn, eds, Origins and Migrations in the Extended Eastern Himalayas, p 153 ff
NL Bor, 1938, "Yano Dafla Grammar and Vocabulary", Journal of the Royal Asiatic Society of Bengal, vol. IV, no. 9

Languages of Arunachal Pradesh
Tani languages
Endangered languages of India